The Welsh Presbyterian Church is a disused church on Princes Road in the Toxteth district of Liverpool, Merseyside, England. It is a redundant church of the Presbyterian Church of Wales, and is recorded in the National Heritage List for England as a designated Grade II listed building.  Because of its tall steeple, the church has been nicknamed the "Welsh Cathedral", or "Toxteth Cathedral", although it was never an actual cathedral.
In 2019, it received National Lottery Stage 1 funding to become a community hub after thirty years abandonment.

History

The church was built between 1865 and 1867, and designed by the local architects W. & G. Audsley. In 1982, when it was no longer used as a Welsh Presbyterian Church, it was sold to the Brotherhood of the Cross and Star, a religious organisation with headquarters in Nigeria. They ceased to use the church in the 1990s, it became vacant, was vandalised, and became derelict. There were plans for the leasehold to be acquired by a partnership of the Merseyside Building Preservation Trust and the Heritage Trust for the North West. As of 2013 the Merseyside Building Preservation Trust is undertaking a feasibility study with the intention to make a bid for a grant from the Heritage Lottery Fund.

Naming

The denomination was created in 1811 and formalized in 1823 as the Welsh Calvinistic Methodists.
See Welsh Methodist revival and Calvinistic Methodists.
From 1928 on, the denomination was also known as the Presbyterian Church in Wales.
So this church, and other buildings may be called Methodist, Calvinist or Presbyterian, but belong to the same establishment (or actually Disestablishment).

Architecture

The church is constructed in rock-faced rubble, and has a patterned slate roof.  It is in High Victorian Gothic style.  The church consists of a nave and transepts, giving it a T-shaped plan.  The tower has angle buttresses, which have niches at the top.  The bell openings are paired and louvred.  On top of the tower are pinnacles and a broach spire with arcading and lucarnes.  Attached to the south transept is a canted stair tower.  On top of the crossing is a slate flèche.  Inside the church are galleries at the west end and in the transepts, which are carried on marble piers.  The nave has a barrel roof supported by wall piers.

See also

Grade II listed buildings in Liverpool-L8

References

External links
Photos of Welsh Presbyterian Church at Derelict Places
More photos of Welsh Presbyterian Church at Derelict Places

Presbyterian Church of Wales
Welsh Presbyterian Church
Churches completed in 1867
19th-century Presbyterian churches
Welsh Presbyterian Church
Grade II listed churches in Merseyside
Gothic Revival church buildings in England
Gothic Revival architecture in Merseyside
19th-century churches in the United Kingdom